is a district of Taitō, Tokyo.

The district is traditionally known for many wholesale stores, and recently known for its large stores selling traditional Japanese dolls (although some of the largest doll stores, such as Kyugetsu and Shugetsu, are located across Edo-dori avenue, thus belonging to the Yanagibashi neighborhood).

Education
Taito City Board of Education operates public elementary and junior high schools.

All of Asakusabashi (1-5 chome) is zoned to Taitō Ikuei Elementary School (台東育英小学校), and Asakusa Junior High School (浅草中学校).

The Ryuhoku campus of the Lycée Franco-Japonais de Tokyo (Franco-Japanese High School of Tokyo) was also located in this neighborhood, until 2011.

Transportation
Asakusabashi Station on the Sobu Line, as well as the station of the same name on the Asakusa Line, are both located in Asakusabashi.

References

External links
  (Asakusabashi bridge)

Districts of Taitō